American writer Alec Rackowe (1897–1991) was a prolific author of romance and women's fiction who published numerous novels and short stories during the mid-twentieth century, including A Stylish Marriage (1948), My Lord America (1950) and All the Millionaires (1967). His works, many of which were marketed to female audiences, appeared in the magazines Redbook, Collier’s, Woman, Ladies’ Home Journal, McCall’s, Maclean's, The Saturday Evening Post, and Good Housekeeping, among others.

Life 
Alexander Daudet Rackowe was born in 1897, the son of Lithuanian playwright Nahum Rakov. Rackowe died in 1991 at age 94.

Bibliography

Novels 

 A Stylish Marriage (1948)
 My Lord America (1950)
 All the Millionaires (1967)

Short Stories 

 "Just Johnny Porter"
 "Don't Telegraph--Write!" (1936)
 "Inoculation" (1942)
 "Perfectly Normal" (1944)
 "--and a Hank of Hair" (1944)
 "I'm the Girl" (1945)
 "It Takes Two" (1947)
 "A Dog for Paula" (1947)
 "A Different Woman" (1948)
 "Window at East's" (1949)
 "A Place for Children" (1949)
 "Take me to Hollywood" (1953, illustrated by Coby Whitmore)

Film 

 No Time to Marry (1938, credited as "Contract Writer")

References

Women's fiction
1897 births
1991 deaths
20th-century American novelists
American magazine writers